Stoke Prior Halt railway station was a station in Stoke Prior, Herefordshire, England. The station was opened on 8 July 1929 and closed in 1952

References

Further reading

Disused railway stations in Herefordshire
Railway stations in Great Britain opened in 1929
Railway stations in Great Britain closed in 1952
Former Great Western Railway stations